Kodre also known as Kodra(litereally meaning "hill"), is a small village in the Ulcinj Municipality, in southeastern Montenegro.

Demographics
According to the 2011 census, the town had a population of 997 people. The main ethnic group in the village are Albanians with 100% of the population and the main religious group are Roman Catholics.

Populated places in Ulcinj Municipality
Albanian communities in Montenegro